James Jones, Jr. (born December 6, 1958) is a former professional American football running back and kick returner in the National Football League (NFL) for the Dallas Cowboys. He played college football at Mississippi State University.

Early years
Jones attended Vicksburg High School, before moving on to Mississippi State University. He was a three-year starter and had a junior year to remember, when he was one of the nation's scoring leaders and received second-team All-SEC honors.

In 1978, while playing in a pass-oriented offense, he led the team in rushing with 687 yards (5.3 yards per carry) and 10 rushing touchdowns, 24 receptions for 237 yards, and 3 receiving touchdowns, completed 2 passes for 63 yards and 2 touchdowns, and had 3 two-point conversions. He was the nation's seventh leading scorer with 13 touchdowns for 78 points. Against Memphis State University, he rushed for 114 yards on 10 carries (including a 72-yard run) and scored 4 touchdowns. Against Louisiana State University, he registered 162 rushing yards (third in school history) on 30 carries.

In 1979, he was lost for the last 7 games of the year after suffering a knee injury during a 28-9 victory against the University of Tennessee.

Professional career
Jones was selected by the Dallas Cowboys in the third round (80th overall) of the 1980 NFL Draft. As one of Tony Dorsett's backups, he served the role of an all-purpose running back and the team's primary return specialist.

As a rookie, he set franchise records for punt returns (54) and punt return yardage (548), breaking Butch Johnson's previous marks. His 10.1-yard punt return average ranked fifth in the NFL and fourth in the NFC. It also made him the second-leading punt returner in team history. His 22 5-yard kickoff ranked sixth in the NFC. 

In 1981, he had 34 carries for 183 yards and a 5.4-yard average. In 1982, he suffered a serious left knee injury that cost him 11 games, all of the next year and forced him to start the 1984 season on the Physically Unable to Perform list, after having multiple operations.

In 1984 and 1985 he returned as a situational player. He retired before the start of the 1986 training camp.

Jones totaled 1,444 kickoff return yards (20.6 average) and 736 punt return yards (8.5 average) during his career. He registered 331 rushing yards, 312 receiving yards, and 1 touchdown pass.

References

External links
One of the Joneses' Becomes Cowboy Hero

1958 births
Living people
Sportspeople from Vicksburg, Mississippi
Players of American football from Mississippi
American football running backs
Mississippi State Bulldogs football players
Dallas Cowboys players